Gustavo Garcia dos Santos (born 4 January 2002) is a Brazilian footballer who plays as a right back for Palmeiras.

Career statistics

Club

Honours
Palmeiras
Copa Libertadores: 2021

References

2002 births
Living people
Footballers from São Paulo
Brazilian footballers
Brazil youth international footballers
Association football defenders
Sociedade Esportiva Palmeiras players
Campeonato Brasileiro Série A players